Chelyabinsk Tube Rolling Plant (also known as ChelPipe; abbreviated as ChTPZ) manufactures every kind of steel pipe, including pipes used for the construction of petroleum, natural gas and water pipelines; and pipes used in manufacturing processes.

Overview
The company was established in 1942 and is based in Chelyabinsk. It is involved in the production and distribution of steel pipes,<ref>with its main products being large diameter welded pipes, small diameter hot-worked seamless pipes (108–169 mm diameter) and cold-worked seamless pipes (89–426 mm diameter). Chelyabinsk Pipe Rolling Plant accounts for 11% of the total Russian pipe production and more than 70% of Russian pipelines currently in operation use pipes made by the company.

In 2008, the plant produced 806,700 tonnes of pipe products. In recent years, it has entered a large scale modernization programme.

The company's important overseas clients include Japan and the United States.  Main production facilities are located in the city of Chelyabinsk, which is just east of the Ural Mountains.  The company's sales office is located in Moscow.

References

External links 
Official Website
Chelyabinsk Tube Rolling Plant - English language and Russian language
Images of Vysota-239, the newest workshop of the Chelyabinsk Tube Rolling Plant
Images of the Pervouralsk New Pipe Plant, a part of the ChelPipe group
Iron Ozone 32, the newest workshop of the Pervouralsk New Pipe Plant

Manufacturing companies of the Soviet Union
Chelyabinsk
Manufacturing companies of Russia
Companies based in Chelyabinsk
Buildings and structures in Chelyabinsk Oblast
Companies listed on the Moscow Exchange
Manufacturing plants in Russia